Obereopsis conradti is a species of beetle in the family Cerambycidae. It was described by Stephan von Breuning in 1957.

Subspecies
 Obereopsis conradti fuscoantennalis Breuning, 1977
 Obereopsis conradti conradti Breuning, 1957

References

coimbatorana
Beetles described in 1957